The 1992 West Virginia Mountaineers football team represented West Virginia University in the 1992 NCAA Division I-A football season. It was the Mountaineers' 100th overall and 2nd season as a member of the Big East Conference (Big East). The team was led by head coach Don Nehlen, in his 13th year, and played their home games at Mountaineer Field in Morgantown, West Virginia. They finished the season with a record of five wins, four losses and two ties (5–4–2 overall, 2–3–1 in the Big East).

Schedule

Roster

References

West Virginia
West Virginia Mountaineers football seasons
West Virginia Mountaineers football